WLSI (900 AM) is a radio station  broadcasting a contemporary Christian format. Licensed to Pikeville, Kentucky, United States, the station is currently owned by Lynn Parrish, through licensee Mountain Top Media LLC.

Previous logos

References

External links
Official Website

LSI
Radio stations established in 1949
1949 establishments in Kentucky
Pikeville, Kentucky